Made in Japan: Akio Morita and Sony is an autobiography of Akio Morita, the co-founder and former chairman of Sony Corporation. It was written with the assistance of Edwin M. Reingold and Mitsuko Shimomura. The book not only narrates the story of Morita, but also of the Sony Corporation's formation in the aftermath of Japan's brutal defeat in World War II, and its subsequent rapid rise to fame and fortune. The book also provides insights into Japanese culture and the Japanese way of thinking, particularly their business management philosophies and styles. The Japanese behavior is explained by putting it into a context based on Japan's history; recent and ancient.

Morita introduces the origins of his family, and how Sony was founded. Chapters picture the war, early tape recorders, and various conclusions on international markets. The transistor was invented in North America in 1947, and Sony took advantage of it. The biography gives authentic details about patent issues, business conferences in various countries, and the invention of the Walkman.

The autobiography was originally published in English in 1986 and has been translated to 12 languages.

Sections
The book is divided into the following nine sections:
 War
 Peace
 Selling to the World (My learning curve)
 On Management (It's all in the family)
 American and Japanese Styles (The difference)
 Competition (The fuel of Japanese Enterprise)
 Technology (Survival Exercise)
 Japan and the World (Alienation and Alliance)
 World Trade (Averting Crisis)

See also
The Japan That Can Say No
Japan
History of Sony

1986 non-fiction books
Japanese autobiographies
Sony